Oppède is a commune in the Vaucluse department in the Provence-Alpes-Côte d'Azur region in southeastern France. Oppidum is the Latin word for 'town'.

History 

It is in fact two villages: Oppède-le-Vieux ("the old" in French), built against the Petit Luberon and dating back to the 12th century, and Oppède-les-Poulivets ("nice view" in Provençal), today known as "le village", down in the valley.

The old village, built on a rocky hill, has narrow streets. In winter, the Petit Luberon starts casting its shadow early in the afternoon. Houses beyond the medieval ramparts are dark, humid and tricky to maintain.

From below the village is dominated by the restored church of Notre-Dame-Dalidon and the ruins of the castle.

In the 19th century, the inhabitants had enough and started to move down in the valley, dismantling the roof of their houses to stop paying property taxes.

By the beginning of the 20th century, Oppède-le-Vieux was a ghost village and a new community was officially established in the valley, with larger streets, cosier houses and farmers closer to their fields.

Following the armistice of June 1940, architect Bernard Zehrfuss founded a commune of artists in the old town, a project that attracted French sculptor François Stahly and the writer and artist Consuelo de Saint Exupéry.  The commune proved short-lived.  It was the basis for Saint Exupéry's fictionalized account, published in 1946, called "Kingdom of the Rocks".

Geography
The commune is traversed by the river Calavon.

Personalities
 Consuelo de Saint-Exupéry
 Ridley Scott
 Jean-Paul Clébert
 Alexey Brodovitch

See also
Communes of the Vaucluse department

References

External links 

 video about Oppede with two free clips  - Oppède le Vieux, a small village in the Luberon

Communes of Vaucluse